The Yuma County Courthouse is a historic building in Yuma, Arizona. It is the third building to serve as the courthouse of Yuma County, Arizona. It was built in 1928, and designed by Ralph Swearingen & G. A. Hanssen, two architects from San Diego, California. It has been listed on the National Register of Historic Places since December 7, 1982.

References

Buildings and structures in Yuma, Arizona
Courthouses on the National Register of Historic Places in Arizona
National Register of Historic Places in Yuma County, Arizona
Government buildings completed in 1928